Abdullah Halman (born 15 August 1987) is a Turkish footballer who plays as a striker for Gaziantep Ankas Spor.

External links
 
 
 

1987 births
Living people
Turkish footballers
Mersin İdman Yurdu footballers
Eskişehirspor footballers
Gaziantep F.K. footballers
Süper Lig players
Sportspeople from Şanlıurfa
Şanlıurfaspor footballers
1461 Trabzon footballers
Ümraniyespor footballers
Tarsus Idman Yurdu footballers
TFF First League players
Association football forwards